The 2003 Asia U19 Cricket tournament was the 2nd edition of ACC Under-19 Cup. 4 teams played in that tournament, India became the champions of this edition.

Group stage

Points table

 Advanced to Final

Matches

Final

References

Cricket in Asia